The 2017 Dockerty Cup was a football (soccer) knockout-cup competition held between men's clubs in Victoria, Australia in 2017, the annual edition of the Dockerty Cup.  Victorian soccer clubs from the 5 State League Divisions, regional, metros and masters leagues - plus the 12 Clubs from the National Premier Leagues Victoria - competed for the Dockerty Cup trophy.

The competition also served as Qualifying Rounds for the 2017 FFA Cup. In addition to the two Victorian A-League clubs, the four semi-finalists qualified for the final rounds of the 2017 FFA Cup, entering at the Round of 32.

Format

Prize fund
The prize fund for the 2017 event is detailed below.

Preliminary rounds

Victorian clubs, participated in the 2017 FFA Cup via the preliminary rounds. This was open to teams from the National Premier Leagues Victoria, Victorian State League divisions, regional and metros leagues. Teams were seeded in terms of which round they would enter based on their division in 2017.

The four qualifiers for the semi-final rounds were:

Semi finals
A total of four teams took part in this stage of the competition, with the matches played on 21 June and 22 June.

Final

References

Dockerty Cup